Alain Desreumaux (born 1944, Stains) is a French historian of religion, specializing on Syrian and Aramaic christo-palestinian communities. He has uncovered manuscripts and inscriptions and published works on codicology and epigraphy.

He is president and cofounder of the Société d'études syriaques.

Works 
1997: Doctrine de l’Apôtre Addaï, dans Les Écrits Apocryphes Chrétiens I - Bibliothèque de la Pléiade 442 - Éditions Gallimard, Paris
 Histoire du roi Abgar et de Jésus : Presentation and translation of the full Syrian text of the Addai doctrine (Brepols)
 Khirbet Es-Samra I: the first volume is entitled Khirbet es-Samra I. It was prepared under the direction of Jean-Baptiste Humbert and Alain Desreumaux, and under the aegis of the "École biblique et archéologique française de Jérusalem" and the "Centre d'études des religions du Livre du CNRS". 
2004:Les Études syriaques - publiées par la Société d'études syriaques ; dir. Alain Desreumaux, Françoise Briquel Chatonnet, Muriel Debié. Geuthner; series Études syriaques. - 956 (21) + 492.3 (21) - ISSN 1771-6144 = Études syriaques. 
2003: Manuscrits chrétiens du Proche-Orient - [printed text] / Françoise Briquel-Chatonnet, Alain Desreumaux, Maria Gorea ... [et al.] ; published by the Centre de conservation du livre (Arles) and the Manumed
2006: Voyage dans la diversité chrétienne - by Alain Desreumaux - Le Monde de la Bible - 174, November–December
2010: Sur les pas des Araméens chrétiens : festschrift to Alain Desreumaux, Geuthner

References

External links 
 DESREUMAUX Alain, resume on Orient-Méditerranée
 Publications on CAIRN
 Complete bibliography on CNRS

20th-century French historians
French historians of religion
French orientalists
French philologists
People from Seine-Saint-Denis
1944 births
Living people